Dr. Walid bin Mohammed al-Samaani (born 1977) is a jurist and administrator who serves as the Minister of Justice in the Government of Saudi Arabia. He was appointed in the first cabinet formed by King Salman bin Abdul-Aziz Al Saud after he assumed the throne on January 23, 2015. 

Previously, al-Samaani was an advisor at King Salman’s office while he was crown prince in July 2013. Al-Samaani also served as a judge at the Saudi Board of Grievances (administrative judiciary).

Early life 
Al-Samaani grew up in Riyadh, with his parents and brothers, where he completed his public education.

Education 
In his youth, al-Samaani was an avid reader, especially literature, jurisprudence, history and intellectual books. He also participated in cultural events and scholarly contests. 

He earned a B.A. in Islamic Law from Riyadh College of Islamic Sharia, Imam Muhammad bin Saud Islamic University, in 1999-2000. He was then nominated as a lecturer at the Department of Jurisprudence at the same college and concluded his first master degree. Al-

Al-Samaani earned his second master’s degree with honors from the Department of Sharia at the High Judicial Institute, part of Imam university. Al-Samaani earned his PhD in comparative law with first class honors from the same institute. His Dissertation was on “the Discretionary jurisdiction of administrative judges - a comparative applied study.” Which received admiration of the panel and recommended for scholarly publishing and circulation.

Career 
On May 21, 2001, al-Samaani joined the Board of Grievances and served as a judge in the administrative, disciplinary, criminal and commercial judiciary. He headed a number of panels; and served as a member of the Technical Affairs Office, specialized in review, research, and classification of rulings and judicial principles. He was appointed as a member of the Training and Development Committee, and a member of the team supervising electronic documentation of rulings. He also served as secretary of the review body establishing judicial principles.

He represented the Board of Grievances in many committees formed at the Cabinet’s Bureau of Experts for studying and amending draft laws and regulations, such as the committee formed for reviewing laws from 2007 to 2013.

As of July 9, 2013, al-Samaani was appointed as a legal advisor at King Salman’s office when he was crown prince, and participated in many judicial seminars.

On January 29, 2015, a royal decree appointed al-Samaani as Minister of Justice in the first cabinet formed by King Salman after he succeeded late King Abdullah.

Other positions Ministry of Justice 
 President of the Supreme Judicial Council
 Member of the Council of Economic and Development Affairs
 Chairman of Alimony Fund
 Chairman of the Support and Liquidation Center
 Chairman of the Saudi Bar Association

Al-Samaani’s work at the Saudi ministry of Justice 
 Judicial specialization through the introduction of number of specialized courts
 Implementing pleadings before the Appellate Court
 Implementing appeals before the Supreme Court
 Preparing for the bankruptcy judiciary
 Launching initiative for audio-visual recording of hearings
 Adopting Model Court initiative for developing judicial work
 Launching commercial courts on October 16, 2017
 Launching labor courts on November 25, 2018
 Launching Paperless Court project
 Launching electronic minutes and judgments
 Issuing a circular prohibiting penalty based on suspicion (“either conviction or acquittal”)
 Launching electronic notices
 Launching the digital transformation of enforcement judiciary
 Launching e-payment service for enforcement of rulings
 Engaging the private sector in enforcement services
 Recognizing new types of enforcement instruments, such as electronic leases and mediation records
 Setting up special centers for implementing child custody and visitation rulings
 Initiating the digital transformation of notarial procedures
 Launching the Property Title Digitization Initiative
 Engaging the private sector in notarial services
 Revoking territorial jurisdiction of notarial offices
 Granting notarization licenses to women for the first time
 Launching Najiz portal for effective and unified communication
 Launching Najiz Center for Judicial Services
 Launching Qayyim initiative for enhancing client satisfaction
 Launching electronic certification of marriage contracts
 Establishing the Alimony Fund
 Empowering women in new roles at the Ministry of Justice
 Contributing to improving Saudi Arabia’s rankings in global indicators such as the World Bank indicators and Global Competitiveness Report
 Establishing the Judicial Command Center to enhance performance and quality
 Launching Law Practice Diploma and granting licenses to successful trainees
 Launching English publication initiative and opening communication channels with the public
 Approving new work rules for mediation offices

 Introducing awards for judges to encourage innovation and enrichment of knowledge

Research 
 The Discretionary Jurisdiction of Administrative Judges - a Comparative Applied Study. (Two volumes.) Dar Al-Maiman for Publishing and Distribution, 2015.
 Participating in the joint development agreement, signed between the Board of Grievances and the Imam Muhammad bin Saud Islamic University.
 Participating in the preparation of the draft regulations for judiciary affairs at the Board of Grievances and the Supreme Judicial Council.
 Presenting a vision for the academic curriculum of the High Judicial Institute of Imam Muhammad bin Saud Islamic University.
 Participating in studying academic standards for Islamic Law programs at Saudi universities.
 Preparing scholarly themes for several courses and seminars, including: The program for drafting rulings; the program for training judge assistants; and the preparatory diploma for the judges of the Board of Grievances.
 Studying the feasibility of establishing a commission for state cases.
 Studying aspects of cooperation between the Board of Grievances and the Egyptian Ministry of Justice.

Scholarly participations 
 Legitimacy and Administrative Justice Symposium, Riyadh.
 Disciplinary Justice Program, Tunisia.
 Decision-making and problem-solving program, Lebanon
 Conference on electronic documentation and archiving systems, the United States.
 Conference on “Justice and Investment: Stakes and Challenges,” Morocco.

References 

Living people
1977 births